The 2011–12 season was Viktoria Plzeň's seventh consecutive season in the Gambrinus liga. Having won the Gambrinus liga the previous season, they entered the competition as defending champions. As league champions they also took part in the UEFA Champions League for the first time in their history.

Plzeň started the season by defeating FC Pyunik in the second qualifying round of the UEFA Champions League, winning with an aggregate score of 9–1. Later that month they claimed the Supercup with a penalty shootout win over rivals Mladá Boleslav. The club subsequently navigated the third qualifying round and play-off round of the Champions League to qualify for the group stage, where they were drawn with giants Barcelona and A.C. Milan as well as BATE Borisov. Plzeň scored their first point on 13 September, drawing 1–1 in Prague against Borisov, and their first win came on matchday 5 in the return fixture. Plzeň recorded another point in the final group match, a 2–2 draw with Milan in the San Siro. Having achieved third place in the group, Plzeň qualified for the Europa League.

In the new year, Plzeň entered the UEFA Europa League round of 32, where they lost over two legs to German outfit Schalke 04, this was soon followed by an aggregate defeat to Mladá Boleslav in the Czech Cup. Other than one loss, a 4–0 defeat at home against Olomouc, Plzeň were undefeated in the league in the spring part and went into the final match against title rivals Liberec knowing that a win would seal the title for either team, although a draw would end Plzeň's hopes. The game finished goalless and Liberec won the title, Plzeň having to settle for third place.

Gambrinus liga

Results summary

League table

Matches

July

August

September

October

November

December

February

March

April

May

Czech Cup 

As a Gambrinus liga team, Plzeň entered the Czech Cup at the second round stage. In the second round, they comfortably overcame home side Karlovy Vary by a 4–1 scoreline. The third round match at Baník Sokolov was another comfortable game, with Plzeň emerging 3–1 winners. In the fourth round, up against Gambrinus liga competition for the first time in the form of Mladá Boleslav, Plzeň managed a draw in the first game before losing by a two-goal margin in the second leg and therefore losing on aggregate and going out of the competition.

Czech Supercup 
As winners of the previous season's Gambrinus liga, Plzeň played defending cup champions Mladá Boleslav in the Czech Supercup on 22 July. After finishing 1–1 in normal time, Plzeň prevailed on penalties to win the cup. Having lost to Sparta in the inaugural super cup the previous season, this was Plzeň's first title.

UEFA Champions League

Qualifying rounds
Plzeň entered the UEFA Champions League in the second qualifying round, due to finishing first in the 2010–11 Gambrinus liga. In their first match, they faced Armenian opponents FC Pyunik, winning 9–1 on aggregate. In the third round of qualifying it was Rosenborg BK of Norway who were Plzeň's opposition, Plzeň coming through the tie 4–2 on aggregate. The next round, the playoff round, would determine which team would advance to the lucrative group stage of the competition. Denmark's F.C. Copenhagen were the team standing between Plzeň and the group stage; Plzeň won both legs of their match and progressed to the group stage. Due to the reconstruction of Plzeň's stadium, Viktoria played the play-off round at Eden Arena in Prague.

Group stage

Plzeň were seeded in the fourth pot for the draw, being drawn in Group H alongside defending champions Barcelona as well as A.C. Milan and BATE Borisov. In the group stage, Plzeň played their home matches at Eden Arena in Prague due to the ongoing development of their own Stadion města Plzně.

Plzeň scored their first Champions League point in the 1–1 home draw against BATE. In the following matches, in which they played away against Milan and Barcelona, Plzeň had difficulties, losing 2–0 both games and not even managing a single shot on goal in the latter.

On gameday four, Plzeň hosted Barcelona. Being reduced to ten men and witnessing a Lionel Messi hat-trick, Plzeň lost in front of a crowd of over 20,000 by a 4–0 scoreline. The last two games showed a marked improvement for Plzeň as they defeated BATE in Minsk and then scored two late goals to draw 2–2 with Milan in Prague. Finishing third in the group, they qualified for the 2011–12 UEFA Europa League knockout phase.

UEFA Europa League 
Plzeň continued their European adventure in February 2012 with a match against German outfit Schalke 04. After a 1–1 draw in the first leg, Rajtoral scored a late equaliser in Germany to take the tie into extra time. However, the German side, in front of a crowd of over 50,000, scored two goals in the additional period, signalling the end of European football this season for Plzeň.

References 

Viktoria Plzen
FC Viktoria Plzeň seasons
Viktoria Plzen
Viktoria Plzen